Donald Francis Xavier Munden (born 17 October 1934) is a former English cricketer.  Munden was a right-handed batsman who bowled leg break.  He was born at Leicester, Leicestershire.

Munden made his first-class debut for Leicestershire against Essex in the 1960 County Championship at Coventry Road, Hinckley. He made six further first-class appearances for the county, the last of which came against Surrey in the 1961 County Championship at The Oval. In his seven matches for Leicestershire, he scored 98 runs at an average of 7.53, with a high score of 34.

His brothers, Paul and Victor, both played first-class cricket.

References

External links
Donald Munden at ESPNcricinfo
Donald Munden at CricketArchive

1934 births
Living people
Cricketers from Leicester
English cricketers
Leicestershire cricketers